Protein argonaute-2 is a protein that in humans is encoded by the EIF2C2 gene.

This gene encodes a member of the Argonaute family of proteins which play a role in RNA interference. The encoded protein is highly basic, and contains a PAZ domain and a PIWI domain. It may interact with Dicer1 and play a role in short-interfering-RNA-mediated gene silencing.

Interactions
EIF2C2 has been shown to interact with
 DDX20, 
 DICER1,
 FMRP, FXR1P, FXR2P, and
 TNRC6B.

References

Further reading

RNA interference